Shimmy Rivers and and Canal was a UK beat combo that was formed in Dalston, London in 2003.

In 2005 Resonance FM released a collection of demo recordings. The same year, the band played at  Resonance FM's 3rd Anniversary event at the Conway Hall, and in 2006–2007 hosted the station's 'Daddy Said So Land' radio show.

Shimmy Rivers and and Canal disbanded in February 2009, playing a final gig at Barden's Boudoir on February 27. The band agreed to release a 7" record, first on White Heat, then on the Siltbreeze record label, however, both bailed. Their debut album, Forks, recorded and mixed by Capitol K, was left available in 2009.

Albums
Forks, 2009,

EP's
The Endless Discourse, 2005, Resonance FM
Picnic At Angst Rock, 200?, White Heat (cancelled), Siltbreeze (cancelled)

Split Release
Dapp In Ze Romb, Split cassette with Blanket, 2006, Undereducated

Compilations
The Winking Cowboy, The Stolen Recordings Compilation SR-006, 2005 
International Wrong Billy Billy, from Nocturne: Late Nights At The Whitechapel, Manic Squat Records, 2007
Hadrian's Wall, The Stolen Recordings Compilation SR-008, 2007
Wird, from Utrophia 03 Compilation, 2006 
Fear Of Smell, from the Caff/Flick Compilation, 2006

References

Post-punk revival music groups